The Portland State Vikings college football team represents Portland State University in the Big Sky Conference (Big Sky). The Vikings compete as part of the National Collegiate Athletic Association (NCAA) Division I Football Championship (FCS). The program has had 13 head coaches since it began play during the 1947 season. Since December 2014, Bruce Barnum has served as the head coach at Portland State.

The team has played nearly 700 games over 65 seasons of Portland State football. In that time, two coaches have led the Vikings to postseason appearances: Pokey Allen and Tim Walsh. Three coaches also won conference championships: Jerry Lyons won two as a member of the Oregon Collegiate Conference; Don Read and Allen won a combined six as a member of the Western Football Conference. Walsh is the leader in seasons coached with fourteen years with the program. Walsh is also the leader in games won with 90 and Allen has the highest winning percentage of those who have coached more than one game, with .703. Ron Stratten and Jerry Glanville are tied with the lowest winning percentage of those who have coached more than one game, with .273.

Key

Coaches

Notes

References 
General

 
 

Specific

Lists of college football head coaches

Oregon sports-related lists
Portland, Oregon-related lists